Roger Tambellini (born March 11, 1975) is an American professional golfer who has played on the PGA Tour and Web.com Tour.

Tambellini was born in San Luis Obispo, California. He played at the University of Southern California and turned professional in 1998.

Tambellini has won three times on the Nationwide Tour. His first win came at the 2003 Albertsons Boise Open, his second came at the 2005 Price Cutter Charity Championship and the third came at the 2009 Ford Wayne Gretzky Classic. He has also won once on the NGA Hooters Tour in 1999.

Tambellini played on the PGA Tour in 2004 and 2006. He got his tour card for 2004 through Q-School but was not able to retain it after making only 12 of 28 cuts. He finished in 12th on the 2005 Nationwide Tour money list which earned him his PGA Tour card for 2006. Tambellini struggled in 2006 on tour, making only 7 of 25 cuts. In 2009, he finished 7th on the Nationwide Tour money list to earn his 2010 PGA Tour card.

Professional wins (7)

Nationwide Tour wins (3)

Nationwide Tour playoff record (0–1)

Other wins (4)
One NGA Hooters Tour event
1999 Straight Down Fall Classic (with Michael Rowley)
2002 Straight Down Fall Classic (with Michael Rowley)
2007 Straight Down Fall Classic (with Michael Rowley)

Results in major championships

CUT = missed the half-way cut
Note: Tambellini only played in the U.S. Open.

See also
2003 PGA Tour Qualifying School graduates
2005 Nationwide Tour graduates
2009 Nationwide Tour graduates

References

External links

American male golfers
USC Trojans men's golfers
PGA Tour golfers
Korn Ferry Tour graduates
Golfers from California
Golfers from Scottsdale, Arizona
People from San Luis Obispo, California
1975 births
Living people